Riverwalk, also known as the Fort Lauderdale Riverwalk, is a riverwalk along New River in Fort Lauderdale, Florida. Its length is over a mile and goes from the Sailboat Bend neighborhood to near the Stranahan House. It is in the former club district in downtown Fort Lauderdale. There are two main streets that run through the district, Las Olas Boulevard and Himmarshee Street. In addition to the bars and clubs, there used to be restaurants, cafes, and a movie theater. It is being redeveloped into a residential area.

The concept of the riverwalk was first proposed in 1926. After a 1986 bond issue, it started being developed and the first section was completed in 1990.

One area of Riverwalk is known as "Himmarshee Village", which is down Himmarshee Street passing the train-tracks. There are several bars, clubs, cafes, and restaurants. The Himmarshee Village was developed n the late 60s as a peaceful village dwelling. The New River canal ran adjacent to the Village, where the locals fished or set traps for blue crab.

Other nearby landmarks includes the Museum of Science & Discovery.There is also a park that runs along with waterfront that is home to many festivals and events.

References

External links

 Go Riverwalk
 Attractions in Riverwalk

Geography of Fort Lauderdale, Florida
Entertainment districts in Florida
1960s establishments in Florida